An ice storm is a type of storm characterized by freezing rain.

Ice Storm or Icestorm may also refer to:

 Ice storm warning, a message issued by the U.S. National Weather Service
 The Ice Storm, a 1994 novel by Rick Moody
 The Ice Storm (film), a 1997 film by Ang Lee
The Ice Storm (soundtrack), soundtrack from the film
 IceStorm, an open-source toolchain for iCE (FPGA) devices
 Icestorm, a low power CPU core design implemented in the Apple A14 and Apple M1 processors